Daniel Isaac Block (born 1943) (D.Phil., School of Archaeology and Oriental Studies, University of Liverpool) is a Canadian/American Old Testament scholar. He is Gunther H. Knoedler Professor Emeritus of Old Testament at Wheaton College.

He was awarded a BEd (University of Saskatchewan, Saskatoon, 1968), studied at Friedrich Alexander University, Erlangen, 1968–1969), awarded BA (University of Saskatchewan, Saskatoon, 1969), MA (Trinity Evangelical Divinity School, Deerfield, Illinois, 1973), D.Phil. (School of Archaeology and Oriental Studies, University of Liverpool, 1982).

He has worked as a senior translator on the New Living Translation, revised edition with particular responsibility for the books of Moses.

Bibliography

Books

Articles

Chapters

References

External links
contains Daniel I. Block's profile

Living people
1943 births
Wheaton College (Illinois) faculty
Trinity Evangelical Divinity School alumni
Alumni of the University of Liverpool
University of Saskatchewan alumni
University of Erlangen-Nuremberg alumni
American biblical scholars
Old Testament scholars
Translators of the Bible into English
Bible commentators
Canadian expatriates in the United Kingdom
Canadian expatriates in the United States